Caroline Hansen may refer to:

 Caroline Graham Hansen (born 1995), Norwegian footballer
 Caroline Boman Hansen (1860–1956), Swedisn–Norwegian hotelier
 Caroline Møller Hansen (born 1998), Danish football player